Junodia amoena is a species of praying mantis found in Ethiopia, Kenya, Mozambique, and Tanzania.

See also
List of mantis genera and species

References

Junodia
Mantodea of Africa
Insects described in 1899